The AFF Women's Championship is the competition in women's football organised by the ASEAN Football Federation, contested by the national teams of nations in Southeast Asia and Australia. The official tournament started in 2004, hosted by Vietnam and won by Myanmar.

Results
A 2017 edition was planned in Thailand but was later cancelled by the ASEAN Football Federation in February 2017 citing the big amount of major women's football tournament already scheduled in Asia for the year. The 2020 edition to be held in the Philippines was also postponed to 2021, and later rescheduled in 2022 due to the COVID-19 pandemic.

Teams reaching the top four

Participating nations

Legend

  — Champions
  — Runners-up
  — Third place
  — Fourth place

 GS — Group stage
 Q — Qualified for the current tournament
  — Did not enter / Withdrew / Banned
  — Hosts

Summary (2004-2022)

Awards

Winning coaches

Top goalscorers

See also
 AFF Championship
 CAFA Women's Championship
 EAFF E-1 Football Championship (women)
 SAFF Women's Championship
 WAFF Women's Championship
 AFC Women's Asian Cup

References

External links
  at the ASEAN Football Federation
  at soccerway.com

 

 
AFF competitions
Women's association football competitions in Asia
Recurring sporting events established in 2004
2004 establishments in Southeast Asia
Annual sporting events